is a railway station in Miyagino-ku, Sendai, Miyagi Prefecture, Japan, operated by East Japan Railway Company (JR East).

Lines
Higashi-Sendai Station is served by the Tōhoku Main Line, and is located 355.8 kilometers from the official starting point of the line at Tokyo Station.

Station layout
The station has one side platform and one island platform connected to the station building by a footbridge. The station has a Midori no Madoguchi staffed ticket office.

Platforms

History
Higashi-Sendai Station opened on July 25, 1932. The station was absorbed into the JR East network upon the privatization of the Japanese National Railways (JNR) on April 1, 1987.

Passenger statistics
In fiscal 2018, the station was used by an average of 3,628 passengers daily (boarding passengers only).

Surrounding area
 Nigatake Station on the Senseki Line
Sendai-Higashi Post Office
Sendai-Nitta Post Office

See also
 List of Railway Stations in Japan

References

External links

  

Railway stations in Sendai
Stations of East Japan Railway Company
Tōhoku Main Line
Railway stations in Japan opened in 1932